Mukasovo 2-e (2-se Moqas) is a rural locality (a village) in Mukasovsky Selsoviet, Baymaksky District, Bashkortostan, Russia. The population was 32 as of 2010. There are 2  streets.

Geography 
Mukasovo 2-e is located 44 km northeast of Baymak (the district's administrative centre) by road. Arkaim is the nearest rural locality.

References 

Rural localities in Baymaksky District